The 1st constituency of Fejér County is one of the single member constituencies of the National Assembly, the national legislature of Hungary. The constituency standard abbreviation: Fejér 01. OEVK.

Since 2014, it has been represented by Tamás Vargha of the Fidesz–KDNP party alliance.

Geography
The 1st constituency is located in central part of Fejér County.

List of municipalities
The constituency includes the following municipalities:

Members
The constituency was first represented by Tamás Vargha of the Fidesz from 2014, and he was re-elected in 2018  and 2022.

References

Fejér 1st